Potu Narsimha Reddy was an Indian social reformer, and a member of the Satyagraha movement.  In 1938, he moved from his native Ratnagiri to Chennur taluq of Adilabad District and purchased 10,000 acres (40 km²) of land.  He used his wealth to assist the poor, purchasing food for nearby villages. In 1954 as landowners came under increased pressure from government, which was preparing land reform measures, Reddy voluntarily distributed his land to the poor in his region. He belongs to Dharmaram village near Bheemaram in Jaipur Mandal. He is the architect of mango gardens in all the villages in this region.

Telugu people